Ohio Southern Railroad  is a railroad owned by Genesee & Wyoming Inc. It begins in Zanesville, Ohio along the intersections of Ohio Central Railroad  and Columbus and Ohio River Railroad which are both also owned by Genesee & Wyoming. The other end of the line is in New Lexington, Ohio, with trackage rights on the Kanawha River Railroad (formerly Norfolk Southern) to South Glouster, Ohio.

The company was acquired by Genesee & Wyoming in 2008 as part of its purchase of the Ohio Central Railroad System.

References

External links

Ohio Southern Railroad official webpage - Genesee and Wyoming website
https://web.archive.org/web/20050922213322/http://www.michiganrailroads.com/RRHX/Stories/DT%26I-TheRailroadThatWentNoPlacePart1.htm
http://www.ushistoricalarchive.com/train_maps/cd3/74a.html

Ohio railroads
Genesee & Wyoming